The Datteln-Hamm Canal is a canal in the German state of North Rhine-Westphalia. It links the Dortmund-Ems Canal at Datteln to the city of Hamm.

In Hamm a water exchange facility of the Wasserverband Westdeutsche Kanäle is located that feeds the waterway with water out of the river Lippe to compensate evaporation, infiltration and operation of locks. When the water level of the river Lippe falls below a flow rate of 10 m³/second water out of the Datteln-Hamm Canal is pumped into the Lippe and the canal receives water via pumps from the Ruhr and Rhine.

History 
Canal was constructed between 1906 and 1914 for heavily industrialized area. It has given a commercial navigation. It's one of the most important canals in Germany.

References

Canals in Germany
Transport in North Rhine-Westphalia
Buildings and structures in North Rhine-Westphalia
Federal waterways in Germany
Canals opened in 1914
Canals opened in 1933
CDatteln-Hamm